The Costa Rica women's national under-23 volleyball team represents Costa Rica in women's under-23 volleyball Events, it is controlled and managed by the Costa Rican Volleyball Federation that is a member of North American volleyball body North, Central America and Caribbean Volleyball Confederation (NORCECA) and the international volleyball body government the Fédération Internationale de Volleyball (FIVB).

Results

FIVB U23 World Championship
 Champions   Runners up   Third place   Fourth place

U23 Pan American Cup
 Champions   Runners up   Third place   Fourth place

Team

Current squad
The following list of players represent Costa Rica in the 2018 Women's U23 Pan-American Volleyball Cup
Head coach : Sezar Salas Salazar

Notable players

References

External links
 Costa Rican Volleyball Federation 

Volleyball
National women's under-23 volleyball teams
Volleyball in Costa Rica